Lawson may refer to:

Places

Australia
 Lawson, Australian Capital Territory, a suburb of Canberra
 Lawson, New South Wales, a town in the Blue Mountains

Canada
 Lawson, Saskatchewan
 Lawson Island, Nunavut

United States
 Lawson, Arkansas
 Lawson, Colorado
 Lawson, Missouri
 Lawson, Mesquite, Texas
 Balmoral, Wisconsin, previously known as Lawson

Music
 Lawson (band), a British pop rock band
 Lawson (EP), a 2015 EP by the band
 Lawson (album), a 2005 album by John Schumann and the Vagabond Crew

Transport

Aircraft
 Lawson Airplane Company-Continental Faience and Tile Company, a historic demolished factory complex in Milwaukee, Wisconsin, US
 Lawson L-2, a 1920s biplane airliner
 Lawson L-4, a 1920 biplane airliner designed for long-distance flights

Ships
 HMS Lawson (K516), an American-built British Royal Navy frigate 1943–1946
 Thomas W. Lawson (ship), a seven-masted, steel-hulled schooner built in 1902 and destroyed 1907

Other uses
 Lawson (Breaking Bad), a fictional character in the TV series Breaking Bad
 Lawson (name), people with the surname or given name
 Lawson (store), a convenience store chain headquartered in Japan
 Lawson Arena, Western Michigan University, Kalamazoo, Michigan, US
 Lawson criterion, a figure of merit in nuclear fusion research
 Lawson Software, a company acquired by Infor

See also
 Lawsone, a naphthoquinone dye from henna
 Jean de Lauson (1584-1666), Governor of New France
 Lauzon (disambiguation)
 Lawsonville, North Carolina
 Lawson McGhee Public Library, Knoxville, Tennessee, downtown library branch
 Sam H. Lawson Middle School, Cupertino, California, USA